Anderson is a CDP in Fremont County, Iowa, United States. In 2010, the population of the CDP was 65.

Demographics

References

Census-designated places in Iowa
Census-designated places in Fremont County, Iowa